Height of Land Portage is a historic portage route between the Embarrass River and the Pike River in St. Louis County, Minnesota, United States.  The  route crosses the Laurentian Divide, providing access between the Hudson Bay drainage basin and the Great Lakes Basin.  The portage was a key connection for canoe-based travelers from the 1630s to the 1870s.  It was listed on the National Register of Historic Places in 1992 for its state-level significance in the themes of archaeology, exploration/settlement, and transportation.  It was nominated for its potential archaeological resources and associations with the fur trade and European expansion in North America.

See also
 National Register of Historic Places listings in St. Louis County, Minnesota

References

Archaeological sites on the National Register of Historic Places in Minnesota
Fur trade
Historic districts on the National Register of Historic Places in Minnesota
Historic trails and roads in Minnesota
National Register of Historic Places in St. Louis County, Minnesota
Portages in the United States
Portages on the National Register of Historic Places
Transportation on the National Register of Historic Places in Minnesota